Black Metal 2 is an album by Dean Blunt, released on Rough Trade Records on 11 June 2021. The album was only formally announced on 8 June 2021, following pictures being posted to the social media accounts of collaborators Vegyn and James Massiah depicting a billboard with the album cover; however, references had been made to it by Blunt prior to this, as far back as 2016, including in the description of various releases on SoundCloud. It serves as a sequel to his 2014 album Black Metal and features an edited version of that cover as its album cover. The album features additional vocals from Joanne Robertson on six songs.

The album was produced by Blunt and Giles Kwakeulati King-Ashong, also known as Kwake Bass. The album also features instrumental performances by Mica Levi.

Critical reception

Black Metal 2 was met with very positive reviews; on review aggregator Metacritic it has a score of 85/100, indicating "universal acclaim", and according to the same site is Blunt's best-received album.

Accolades

Track listing

All tracks written by Dean Blunt, except where noted. All tracks produced by Blunt and Giles Kwakeulati King-Ashong.

Charts

References

2021 albums
Rough Trade Records albums
Art pop albums